Myrthe Bolt (born 26 January 1999) is a Dutch fashion model.

Career 
Bolt signed with Next Model Management debuted at Miu Miu S/S 2017; the next season she walked for brands including Topshop, Versus (Versace), Fendi, and The Row. She has appeared in ads for Just Cavalli, Nordstrom, and Topshop. She has appeared in editorials for CR Fashion Book, British Vogue, Vogue Paris, and WSJ.

In 2018, she walked for the Victoria's Secret Fashion Show.

Personal life 
Bolt is a medical student at the University of Groningen which she prioritizes over her modelling career.

References 

Living people
1999 births
Dutch female models
People from Drenthe
Next Management models